João Henrique Oliveira Veras (born 26 October 2000) is a Brazilian professional footballer who plays as a forward for Ferroviária on loan from Ponte Preta.

Professional career
Veras began his senior career with the Brazilian club XV de Piracicaba in 2019, before transferring to Ponte Preta in 2020. He joined the Portuguese club Portimonense on loan in the Primeira Liga on 13 January 2022, with an option to buy. He made his professional debut with Ponte Preta in a 2–0 Campeonato Paulista win over Novorizontino on 22 July 2020.

On 17 January 2023, Veras moved on a new loan to Ferroviária.

References

External links
 

2000 births
Sportspeople from Federal District (Brazil)
Living people
Brazilian footballers
Association football forwards
Esporte Clube XV de Novembro (Piracicaba) players
Associação Atlética Ponte Preta players
Portimonense S.C. players
Associação Ferroviária de Esportes players
Campeonato Brasileiro Série B players
Brazilian expatriate footballers
Brazilian expatriate sportspeople in Portugal
Expatriate footballers in Portugal